The NZR RM class 88-seaters were a class of railcar used in New Zealand. New Zealand Government Railways (NZR) classified them as RM (Rail Motor), the notation used for all railcars, numbering the 35 sets from RM100 to RM134. They were the most numerous railcars in NZR service. Their purchase and introduction saw the demise of steam-hauled provincial passenger trains and mixed trains, and was part of a deliberate effort to modernise NZR passenger services at a time of increasing competition from private motor vehicles. Being diesel powered and lighter the railcars were less expensive to operate and able to maintain quicker timetables, although became plagued with mechanical and electrical problems, with a number of the class eventually being turned into depowered locomotive-hauled carriages and reclassified as the AC class "Grassgrubs".

Background
In the early 1950s, NZR was in the process of replacing steam traction with diesel and modernising the railways to cope with vastly increased traffic, the after-effects of wartime stringency, and increasing competition from motor vehicles and aeroplanes. As part of this modernisation process, it was decided to upgrade provincial passenger services, which were provided by a combination of steam-hauled passenger trains that operated several times a week, and "mixed" trains that carried both freight and passengers. NZR had experimented with several different classes of railcars, but it was not until after the second World War that railcars began to replace provincial passenger services en masse.

Following the success of the Vulcan railcars introduced in the 1940s, NZR began investigating the replacement of the older Wairarapa class railcars in the mid-1940s with larger diesel-electric railcars. A tender for 25 replacement railcars was approved by Cabinet in 1944, but the second World War delayed responses being completed until 1947. In 1948, NZR decided not to proceed with this tender as the prices received were considered too high. In 1949, Cabinet approved a new tender to replace the Wairarapa railcars and other steam-hauled services, which were to have 88 seats and have braking equipment for the centre rail on the Rimutaka Incline. A total of 35 railcars were now specified. It was decided that engines for the railcars should be mounted underfloor for increased passenger capacity and for a parcels and baggage compartment, with trussed-chassis to support the braking equipment.

Tenders were received from English Electric and the Drewry Car Company. Drewry's tender presented a design for an articulated railcar with seating for 88 passengers, with either Hercules or Fiat  engines. An order was placed with Drewry in the United Kingdom in March 1950 for the railcars with the Fiat engines. Drewry had supplied some smaller diesel shunting locomotives (DSA class and DSB class locomotives) to NZR previously. Due to the progress of the Rimutaka Tunnel (which opened in November 1955), and the impending closure of the Rimutaka Incline, it was decided by NZR to remove the requirement for centre-rail braking and the trussed-chassis required to hold the braking equipment.

Introduction
The railcars were constructed under subcontract by the Birmingham Railway Carriage and Wagon Company from Drewry. There were significant delays in delivering the railcars, with one (RM 120) damaged in transit, and used as a spare parts source for the other railcars. The first railcar was delivered in November 1954 and the last in May 1958.

The arrival of the first railcars was greeted with enthusiasm by local newspapers, and were described as a "new-dawn for long-distance rail travel" in New Zealand. A number of "ministerial special" promotional services were run in March 1955, and the first service operated by an 88-seater railcar was the Wellington-Gisborne daily service on 6 April 1955.

Following their introduction, the railcars suffered overheating from ballast dust and engine failure, which led to railcars running 20 to 30 minutes late every two to three days. This was despite two Fiat fitters being in New Zealand as the railcars went into service.

The railcars also suffered frequent internal fires, which led to external fires in the farmland and foliage along the tracks. Both types of fire were due to excessive hot carbon particles in the exhaust emissions. These problems were most notable in the South Island on steep West Coast railway lines and the steep Scargill and Dashwood sections of the Main North Line. The crankcases were not strong enough to absorb the power of the diesel engines that drove the railcars. These issues were considered so serious that NZR called a meeting with Drewry and Fiat in March 1957. Ten of the railcars had wrecked crankcases and blown motors. Following the meeting, a number of replacement motors and crankcases were ordered in late 1957.

Additional Fiat staff and fitters came to New Zealand from Italy and essentially rebuilt the engines and power systems of all the railcars. The rebuilding was completed in March 1959, and the Minister reported that the railcars were giving "much better service" as a result.

Second batch
The second batch of 15 railcars was authorised by the government in October 1955, but cancelled in 1956 due to the unsatisfactory performance of the first batch of railcars, in particular, their high cost in repairs and excessive diversion of skilled labour for those repairs, particularly in Auckland.

In service
In early December 1955, NZR ran a four-day demonstration train from Picton to Invercargill, creating much public interest. After initial trials around Wellington, the railcars were deployed on a wide variety of provincial services. In the North Island they ran:
 Auckland – Okaihau and Opua (starting 12 November 1956);
 Auckland – Te Puke (starting 8 February 1959); 
 Auckland – Rotorua (starting 8 February 1959); 
 Auckland – Taumaranui and New Plymouth (starting 26 November 1956);
 Wellington – Napier and Gisborne (starting 1 August 1955)

In the South Island they ran:
 Christchurch – Picton (starting 12 February 1956);
 Christchurch – Invercargill (starting 13 February 1956);
 Christchurch – Greymouth and Ross in conjunction with the Vulcan class (starting 20 February 1956).

Operation
From almost the beginning the railcars faced mechanical problems, with cooling being the primary issue, along with crankcase failures and electrical fires towards the end of their lives. Although modifications were made they continued to have a reputation for unreliability throughout their career, frequently having to run with one motor isolated.

The 1950s was a period of increased prosperity and saw massive increases in the numbers of private motorcars, along with improvements to roads such as the tar sealing of main highways, and the construction of new roads such as the Auckland Harbour Bridge. Growing road traffic led to the requirement in 1956 that all railcars have headlights on at all times.

While the delay in introducing the railcars on the Rotorua route (1959) and the difficult geography of the Northland and Bay of Plenty service meant poor patronage, the railcars stabilised NZRs long-distance rail patronage at 3 million passengers annually from 1959 to 1964. But by the mid-1960s the railcars were dated, patronage fell and services became unprofitable.

Main trunk services
The 1952 Royal Commission recommended railcar services on the North Island Main Trunk and replacing the daylight multiple stops train on the Main South Line (which supplemented the South Island Limited and other fast express services) leaving Dunedin at 8:05 am and Christchurch at 9:40 am on Monday, Wednesday and Friday and replace local trains between Auckland and Hamilton, Wellington and Palmerston North, Christchurch and Ashburton. These services did not eventuate following the decision to cancel the second batch of railcars in 1956.

Replacement engines
NZR requested the calling of tenders for new engines and crankshafts for all 35 railcars plus spares for £1.05 million New Zealand pounds in July 1966. In January 1967 the Cabinet approved only replacement crankshafts to continue the railcars for five years on the Wairarapa, Wellington-Napier-Gisborne and Auckland-New Plymouth routes and to conduct trials of fast upgraded railcar service between Auckland and Hamilton (later known as the "Blue Streak" service) and Wellington and Palmerston North. At the time it was intended to scrap all railcar services in the South Island, except for Vulcans on the Picton (Vulcan railcars and summer passenger trains replaced the 88-seaters on this route from 1967 to 1968) and West Coast services.

Service cancellations
From 31 July 1967 all railcar services between Auckland and Northland were cancelled, along with services from Auckland and Hamilton to Tauranga and Te Puke. The railcar service to New Plymouth was kept but was cut back to operate between New Plymouth and Taumarunui in 1971, with passengers making connections to North Island Main Trunk trains. This service lasted until 11 February 1978 when it was replaced by a carriage train. The final run of an 88-seater railcar was in 1978 from Greymouth to Christchurch. The last trip came to an ignominious end when an engine failure and fire meant that passengers had to be taken onwards from Otira by bus.

Almost all cancelled trains were replaced by New Zealand Railways Road Services buses.

Withdrawals 
By 1971, 10 of the original 35 railcars had been withdrawn, due to engine problems or collisions with motor vehicles.

In 1976 it was announced that no more railcars would receive major overhaul works, and they would be withdrawn from service as they wore out. Although the remaining services were to areas not well served by road, the mechanical condition of the railcars meant that by the mid-1970s replacement was becoming urgent. By 1978, the only remaining railcars in NZR service were the Silver Ferns.

Blue Streaks

In 1968, at the suggestion of Hamilton City Council, an 88-seater was refurbished for a new fast service between Hamilton and Auckland aimed at business customers, and it started on Monday, 8 April 1968. It was fitted with carpet and re-upholstered fabric-covered seats, and was painted in a new two-tone blue colour scheme that prompted the nickname Blue Streak. The seating was reduced to 84 to accommodate a servery area from which light meals and assorted alcoholic and non-alcoholic drinks could be purchased. This was notable as the first time that a regularly scheduled passenger train service in New Zealand had reinstated onboard catering since dining cars had been withdrawn across the network as an economy measure during World War I. This initial service was unsuccessful, with patronage well below the levels needed to be profitable. The service might have been successful if run the other way round from Hamilton to Auckland in the morning but in 1968 the Wellington-Auckland Limited and Express were still timetabled to cater for the early morning commuter market from Hamilton and Huntly or in the other direction from Palmerston North and Levin and those leaving Auckland or Wellington in the evening for the Waikato or Manawatu or Horowhenua, while the NZR long term desire to maintain the New Plymouth- Auckland railcar service was much more because it brought people into Auckland in the morning, leaving Taumarunui at 6.30 am and Hamilton at 9.30 am and returned in the afternoon rather than for its night social and paper service through the King Country which Government saw as essential. Therefore, the Hamilton commuter market was served by many other services at lower second class fare cost in 1968 and the Blue Streak experiment was simply in the wrong direction at the wrong time.

It was decided to introduce the railcar to a daytime service between Auckland and Wellington. This service, which started on Monday 23 September 1968, was highly successful and prompted the conversion of two further cars to 82 seats each to accommodate larger servery areas and, later, the purchase of the Silver Fern diesel-electric railcars for this service.

Initially, the Main Trunk Blue Streak railcar ran from Wellington to Auckland on Mondays, Wednesdays and Fridays and on Tuesdays and Thursdays from Auckland to Wellington until a second railcar was refurbished for the Christmas 1968 and New Year 1969 period and a third for the 1969 Easter holidays. The service proved so popular that it was not uncommon to see two of the railcars running in multiple.

On Thursday 18 December 1972, the Blue Streak services were replaced by the new Silver Fern railcars and were transferred to the Wellington-to-New Plymouth service, replacing Standard railcars. They continued in this service until Friday 30 July 1977. By that time they were no longer serviceable, patronage had continued to decline and the service was replaced with buses.

Grassgrubs
In March 1976, NZR general manager Tom Small instructed his chief mechanical engineer to prepare plans to convert 14 railcars to unpowered carriages. In April 1976 the chief mechanical engineer reported that 23 railcars were suitable for conversion to locomotive-hauled passenger carriages. A formal white paper proposal was put to Treasury on 23 July 1976. The paper argued that conversion of the railcars to locomotive-hauled carriages was the most viable option given that most railcars were expected to have to be withdrawn by mid 1977 due to mechanical problems. The paper noted that as locomotive-hauled carriages, the railcars would not be able to maintain the same schedules, having to be slower when towed. While the paper recommended conversion, it also noted that the conversions were only a medium-term solution to maintain rail passenger services. Cabinet agreed to the proposal following Treasury advice to convert 14 railcars on 27 September 1976.

NZR's workshops began the conversions of the railcars. The workshops removed the railcars engines and drivers' cabs, added new lighting, seating, heaters, generators and new vinyl flooring. The carriages were classified as "AC". These carriages were refurbished painted a unique grass green (a Resene paint known as "Trendy Green.") with grey roofs and came to be known as "Grassgrubs" following an article in The Press describing the converted railcars as "The Grass-Grub Express" in an article on the trial run of the carriages on 1 December 1977.

Small's successor as general manager, Trevor Hayward, insisted on this scheme, as railway historian David Leitch put to Hayward in a letter that traditional Midland red was associated with poor service, arguing that if the public saw the carriages as just old red railcars hauled by locomotives, that would have negative connotations.

The first Grassgrub train ran on 5 December 1977 from Picton to Christchurch. The Napier-Gisborne Grassgrub service began on 20 March 1978, and proved popular. Between May and August average daily ridership was 61 per cent of capacity. The Grassgrubs were also used on the New Plymouth to Taumarunui, Wellington to Palmerston North via the Wairarapa and Christchurch to Greymouth services.

The Grassgrubs were ill-fated. Their drawgear and bodies were not designed to be locomotive-hauled and they quickly wore out. By 1985 they had all been withdrawn from service due to metal fatigue. The South Island based Grassgrubs were the first to be replaced by 56-foot carriages on the Picton-Christchurch and Christchurch-Greymouth services by 1983. The remaining Grassgrubs were moved to Wellington and remained in use on the Wellington-Gisborne, Wellington-Wairarapa services. The Gisborne service Grassgrubs were withdrawn by 1984, along with the Wellington-Wairarapa services in 1985.

Most of the passenger runs were continued after their demise, but the New Plymouth-Taumarunui service ended on 23 January 1983 (having already had its rolling stock replaced by 56-foot carriages.) The Wellington to Gisborne service eventually terminated at Napier following Cyclone Bola in March 1988. By July 1988, the Wellington-Wairarapa service was abbreviated to terminate in Masterton as patronage on the Masterton – Palmerston North section was often fewer than 20 passengers per trip, due to improved highways and bus services.

The Grassgrubs were sent to Douglas, Taranaki for scrapping, after their useful parts were stripped out of them at Easttown Workshops. One set was sold to the Ministry of Transport for fire service training at Auckland International Airport and has been preserved (see below).

Preservation

Following withdrawal from service, a number of the 88 seaters were stored around the country. Several units along with a Vulcan railcar were sold to the Southern Rail preservation project at Christchurch where they were later scrapped; the cab and baggage car section of the No.1 end of RM 119 on the leading bogie together with some engines and gearboxes were kept at this time. After the project was wound up, the partial section of RM 119 was moved to Linwood Locomotive Depot where it remained in storage for several years. Subsequently, the further abbreviated RM 119 consisting of just the cab and part of the baggage compartment was stored in a Bromley scrapyard, where it was found and purchased by the RM 133 Trust Board.

By the early 1990s, the only known survivor was RM 133 in its "Grassgrub" form as AC 8140, used for fire training at Auckland Airport. In 2001 the RM 133 Trust Board was able to obtain this car, which was later found to be the No 1 end of RM 133 and the No 2 end of RM 115. Before the railcar could be removed a fire broke out in the No 2 half of the railcar, damaging the body. The RM 133 Trust decided to look for any other extant railcar halves to pair with the No 1 end of RM 133, which had been moved to the Pahiatua Railcar Society's site.

In late 2002, the trust located the No 2 end of RM 121 in a quarry at Kerikeri. Although the car was in a weathered condition and had been cut in half at some point, it was still relatively complete despite missing the seats, bogies (removed in the late 1970s at Otahuhu Workshops), and its diesel engines. This railcar was purchased to become the replacement for the damaged half of RM 133 and moved to Pahiatua where restoration work began.

The other half of RM 121 had been separated in the mid-1980s after the railcars were used as offices at a former theme park in the Auckland area and had ended up at a holiday camp in Waitomo. The Trust negotiated with the owners to buy the car body and were eventually able to purchase the car in 2011 in exchange for two former wooden passenger cars. The No 1 end of RM 121 was then trucked to Pahiatua to be reunited with the No 2 end at Pahiatua.

The two halves of RM 121 are now being restored at Pahiatua; the two halves of the No 2 end have been welded together again and a new cab structure and cowcatcher built. The No 1 end has been stripped of any fittings from its time spent at Waitomo and various reconstruction work is taking place. The resultant car will utilise the bogies from AC 8140.

The remnants of the No 1 end of RM 133 and the No 2 end of RM 115 as AC 8140 are in covered storage at Pahiatua.

References

Footnotes

Citations

Bibliography

External links
Pahiatua Railcar Preservation Society
Trainweb Drewry Railcar Page

RM class (88 seater)
Articulated passenger trains
Fiat multiple units
Rail transport in New Zealand